Legislative assembly elections for the Bengal Legislative Assembly were held in January 1946 as part of the 1946 Indian provincial elections.

Seats
The allocation of 250 seats in the assembly was based on the communal award. It is illustrated in the following.

 General elected seats- 78
 Muslim electorate seats- 117
 Urban seats- 6
 Rural seats- 111
 Anglo-Indian electorate seats- 3
 European electorate seats- 11
 Indian Christian electorate seats- 2
 Commerce, Industries and Planting seats- 19
 Port of Calcutta
 Port of Chittagong
 Bengal Chamber of Commerce
 Jute Interest
 Tea Interest
 Railways
 Traders Associations
 Others
 Zamindar seats- 5
 Labour representatives- 8
 Education seats- 2
 University of Calcutta- 1
 University of Dacca- 1
 Women seats- 5
 General electorate- 2
 Muslim electorate- 2
 Anglo-Indian electorate- 1

Results

References

Further sources
Shila Sen: Muslim Politics in Bengal 1937-47. Impex India: New Delhi, 1976 (online summary)
 Assembly Proceedings Official Report Bengal Legislative Assembly Second Session 1946 The 17th 24th 25th 26th 27th 30th and 31st July and 1st August 1946 (online version)
 AdvocateTanmoy.com: History of West Bengal Legislative Assembly from 1861

1946 elections in India
Bengal Presidency